This is a list of notable libertarian organizations.

Caucuses
 LPRadicals
 Republican Liberty Caucus
 Mises Caucus

Think tanks and non-profit institutions

 Americans for Limited Government
 Atlas Economic Research Foundation
 Cascade Policy Institute
 Cato Institute – Washington, DC
 Centre for Civil Society
 Center for Individual Freedom
 Center for Libertarian Studies (CLS; defunct) – New Delhi, India
 Centre for Independent Studies (CIS)
 Competitive Enterprise Institute
 Families Against Mandatory Minimums (FAMM)
 Foundation for Economic Education (FEE)
 Foundation for Rational Economics and Education (FREE)
 Fraser Institute
 The Independent Institute
 Institute for Humane Studies (IHS)
 Institute for Justice (IJ)
 Institute of Public Affairs (IPA)
 Jerusalem Institute for Market Studies
 John William Pope Center for Higher Education Policy
 Libertas Institute (LI)
 Ludwig von Mises Institute – Alabama, US
 Pacific Research Institute (PRI)
 Reason Foundation – Publisher of Reason

Issue and activist

 ACT on Campus
 Alliance of Libertarian Activists (ALA; defunct)
 Bureaucrash
 Campaign for Liberty
 Center for a Stateless Society (C4SS)
 Copblock
 Downsize DC Foundation
 The Future of Freedom Conference (FOF; defunct)
 Free State Project
 FreedomWorks
 Freedom School
 International Society for Individual Liberty (ISIL)
 Libertarian Alliance
 Libertarian League
 Libertarian Party (United States)
 Libertair, Direct, Democratisch (defunct)
 Rampart College (defunct)
 Society for Libertarian Life (SLL; defunct)
 Students for a Libertarian Society (SLS; defunct)
 Students for Liberty (SFL)
 World Libertarian Order (WLO)
 Young Americans for Liberty (YAL)

Publishers and publications
 Heroic Destiny Productions
 Fimbul Winter Books
 Laissez Faire Books
 Liberty (magazine)
 Reason (magazine)
 The Voluntaryist

Other
 The Atlas Society
 Free State Project
 International Society for Individual Liberty ("ISIL")
 Libertarians for Life
 Liberty Fund
 Prometheus Award – presented by the Libertarian Futurist Society

See also

 List of libertarian political parties
 Outline of libertarianism

 
Lists of organizations